Sufczyce  is a village in the administrative district of Gmina Oleśnica, within Staszów County, Świętokrzyskie Voivodeship, in south-central Poland.

The village has a population of  315.

Demography 
According to the 2002 Poland census, there were 312 people residing in Sufczyce village, of whom 52.6% were male and 47.4% were female. In the village, the population was spread out, with 25.3% under the age of 18, 35.3% from 18 to 44, 17.3% from 45 to 64, and 21.2% who were 65 years of age or older.
 Figure 1. Population pyramid of village in 2002 — by age group and sex

References

Sufczyce